Robert Barry Burnett (born August 27, 1967) is a former defensive end who played in the NFL for 14 seasons.

High school and college
Burnett attended Newfield High School located on Long Island, New York. He played college football at Syracuse University, where he was a four-year letterman, and was a semifinalist for the Lombardi Award in 1989, his senior year.

NFL career
Rob Burnett was drafted in the 5th round with the 129th pick in the 1990 NFL Draft by the Cleveland Browns, with whom Burnett made his only Pro Bowl. He played there until the Browns moved to Baltimore, when he became a member of the Ravens. Playing for the Baltimore Ravens into 2001, Burnett earned a Super Bowl Ring when the Ravens defeated the New York Giants in Super Bowl XXXV. Due to salary cap issues, Burnett was not brought back by the Ravens after 2001. After playing two more seasons with the Miami Dolphins, Burnett retired.

After football
In 2006, Rob Burnett became a commentator for WBAL-AM, specifically covering Baltimore Ravens games. Burnett was present during the Ravens' Super Bowl XXXV reunion, in 2010.

Burnett was inducted into the Suffolk Sports Hall of Fame on Long Island in the Football Category with the Class of 2001.

References

1967 births
Living people
American Conference Pro Bowl players
American football defensive ends
Baltimore Ravens announcers
Baltimore Ravens players
Cleveland Browns players
Miami Dolphins players
National Football League announcers
Players of American football from New Jersey
Sportspeople from East Orange, New Jersey
Syracuse Orange football players